Ariss is a surname. Notable people with the surname include:

 Bruce Ariss (1911–1994), American painter, muralist, writer, illustrator, editor, set designer, playwright, and actor
 John Ariss (1725–1799), American architect

See also
 Arins